Pingzhen District is a district in the central part of Taoyuan City, Taiwan, home to 227,047 people.

History
Pingzhen was originally established as Changluliao during the Qing Dynasty rule of Taiwan. In 1920 under the Japanese rule, the city was renamed to Pingzhen. On 1 March 1992, it was upgraded from a rural township as the third county-administered city of Taoyuan County named Pingzhen City. On 25 December 2014, it was upgraded to a district named Pingzhen District when Taoyuan County was upgraded from a county to a municipality.

Geography
The district spans over 47.75km2 of area. It is located on a hilly plateau and the entire district is on a slope.

Demographics
Pingzhen District has a population of 228,325 people as of February 2023. Most people in Pingzhen are Hakka.

Administrative divisions

Pingzeng, Zengxing, Nanshi, Jinxing, Pingan, Pingnan, Shanfeng, Fulin, Yongguang, Zhuangjing, Yongfeng, Yongan, Songwu, Pingxing, Guangxing, Guangda, Guangren, Fudan, Fuxing, Yimin, Yixing, Shuanglian, Gaoshuang, Beishi, Beihua, Xinshi, Beian, Xinrong, Xinfu, Xinying, Xingui, Beixing, Jinling, Beigui, Beifu, Jianan, Huaan, Tungan, Xinan, Tungshi, Longen, Tungshe, Zhongzhen, Maoyi, Longxing and Zhongzheng Village.

Tourist Attractions and Parks

 Xinshi Park
 Bazizhen Riverside Park

Politics
The district is part of Taoyuan City Constituency V electoral district for the Legislative Yuan.

Transportation 
National Highway No. 1
Provincial Highway No. 1
Provincial Highway No. 66
City Routes 112, 113, 113A, and 114
Taiwan Railways Administration: Pingzhen (2026)

Notable natives
 Alicia Liu, model and television personality
 Chu Mu-yen, taekwondo practitioner

See also
 Taoyuan City

References

External links 
 
  

Districts of Taoyuan City